Bernard Charles Molloy (1842 – 26 June 1916) was an Irish lawyer, soldier and politician. His brother was James Lynam Molloy, a successful Irish composer.

Life
Molloy was educated at St. Edmund's College, Ware and at the University of France and the University of Bonn. He became a barrister in the Middle Temple in 1872. He was a Captain in the French Army and won a gold medal for his service during the Franco-Prussian war. He was also Private Chamberlain in the court of the Vatican.

In 1874 he ran for election as member of parliament for the constituency of King's County. He was not elected, but ran again and won in 1880, and in 1885 was elected for the new seat of Birr, which he held until the general election of 1900. He was a Middle Temple lawyer and penal reformer.

He resided at Drummond Lodge, near Milltownpass County Westmeath.

Notes

External links 

"Bernard Charles Molloy, MP", copy on Offaly Historical and Archaeological Society website of article from the King's County Chronicle, 22 October 1885

1842 births
1916 deaths
Home Rule League MPs
Irish Parliamentary Party MPs
Anti-Parnellite MPs
United Irish League
Members of the Parliament of the United Kingdom for King's County constituencies (1801–1922)
UK MPs 1880–1885
UK MPs 1885–1886
UK MPs 1886–1892
UK MPs 1892–1895
UK MPs 1895–1900
Molloy, Bernard Charles